Cartavious "Tank" Bigsby (born August 30, 2001) is an American football running back for the Auburn Tigers.

Early years
Bigsby attended Callaway High School in Hogansville, Georgia. As a senior he rushed for 1,636 yards with 27 touchdowns and as a junior had 2,221 yards and 22 touchdowns. He committed to Auburn University to play college football. He was ranked as the 7th overall recruit in the state of Georgia by 247 Sports, and was ranked as the nation’s top running back by Rivals.

College career
Bigsby took over as Auburn's starting running back his freshman year in 2020. He had his first 100-yard game against Georgia, rushing for 146 yards on 20 carries. Bigsby finished the season averaging 6.0 yards per carry for a total of 834 yards and was voted the SEC Newcomer/Freshman of the Year. In 2021, Bigsby would improve upon his strong freshman season and would rush for 1,099 yards.

References

External links
Auburn Tigers bio

Living people
People from LaGrange, Georgia
Players of American football from Georgia (U.S. state)
American football running backs
Auburn Tigers football players
2001 births